The Brazilian guinea pig (Cavia aperea) (preá in Portuguese) is a guinea pig species found in Argentina, Brazil, Bolivia, Colombia, Ecuador, Guyana, Paraguay, Uruguay and Venezuela.

Cavia aperea has been successfully mated to the domestic guinea pig, Cavia porcellus, though many females become infertile in successive generations.
Brazilian guinea pigs are mainly diurnal animals and are narrower and longer than domesticated guinea pigs.

Description
The tail, at around 2.4 mm, is almost non-existent. The dorsal fur is dark olive-brown mixed with brown and black, and the underparts are a pale grey or yellowish-grey.

Its karyotype has 2n = 64 and a reportedly variable FN of 116 or 128 for C. a. aperea and 128 for C. a. pamparum.

Distribution
Its range extends from Colombia, Ecuador and Venezuela to northern Argentina. Its typical habitat is open grassland and savannah.

Behaviour
Cavia aperea is a herbivore and feeds on grasses and other herbs. It is diurnal, mainly emerging in the early morning to forage and again in the evening. It has latrine areas beside the trackways where piles of bean-shaped droppings can be seen, as can piles of cut grass stems.

Breeding takes place at any time of year but mostly in the austral summer. The gestation period is about 62 days and females can have five litters in a year. The number of young born averages two and ranges from one to five. The minimum age at which the young adults can breed is thirty days.

Status
The Brazilian guinea pig has a wide range and no particular threats have been identified. It is a common species with a stable population and, as well as living in open savannah country, it is capable of adapting to disturbed habitats. For these reasons, the International Union for Conservation of Nature has rated its conservation status as "least concern".

References

Guinea pigs
Rodents of South America
Mammals of Brazil
Mammals of Colombia
Mammals of Argentina
Mammals of Paraguay
Mammals of Uruguay
Mammals of Venezuela
Fauna of the Cerrado
Mammals described in 1777
Taxa named by Johann Christian Polycarp Erxleben